Kleber Janke or simply Kleber Lapa (born April 12, 1988 in Lapa), is a Brazilian defensive midfielder. He currently plays for Paraná.

Contract
1 August 2006 to 31 January 2009

External links
 Kleber Lapa at Sambafoot.com

1988 births
Living people
Brazilian footballers
Paraná Clube players
Brazilian people of German descent
Sportspeople from Paraná (state)
Association football midfielders